The Kalisz Voivodeship was a voivodeship of the Congress Poland, that existed from 1816 to 1837. Its capital was Kalisz. It was established on 16 January 1816, from Kalisz Department, and existed until 23 February 1837, when it was replaced by Kalisz Governorate. During the January Uprising, the Polish National Government, announced the re-establishment of the voivodeships with the borders from 1816, reestablishing the administration of the Kalisz Voivodeship within the part of Warsaw Governorate. It existed from 1863 to 1864, when it was abolished, and replaced by the Warsaw Governorate.

Subdivisions 
 Kalisz District
 Kalisz County
 Warta County
 Konin District
 Konin County
 Pyzdry County
 Sieradz District
 Sieradz County
 Szadek County
 Wieluń District
 Częstochowa County
 Ostrzeszów County
 Wieluń County
 Piotrków District
 Piotrków County
 Radom County

Citations

Notes

References 

Voivodeships of the Congress Poland
History of Greater Poland
Kalisz
States and territories established in 1816
States and territories disestablished in 1837
States and territories established in 1863
States and territories disestablished in 1864
1863 establishments in Poland